HMS Tyrian was a S-class destroyer built for the Royal Navy during the Second World War.

Description
She was powered by two Parsons geared steam turbines, each driving one propeller shaft, using steam provided by two Admiralty three-drum boilers. Her complement was 170 officers and ratings.

The ship was armed with four 45-calibre 4.7-inch (120 mm) Mark XII guns in dual-purpose mounts. For anti-aircraft (AA) defence, Tyrian had one twin mount for Bofors 40 mm guns and four twin  Oerlikon autocannon. She was fitted with two above-water quadruple mounts for  torpedoes. Two depth charge rails and four throwers were fitted for which 70 depth charges were provided.

Construction and career
Between 1946 and 1951 Tyrian was held in reserve at Harwich. Between 1951 and 1952 she was converted to a Type 16 fast anti-submarine frigate, by Harland & Wolff at Liverpool. She was also allocated the new pennant number F67. From August 1952 until 1956 she was part of the 2nd Training Squadron at Portland. In 1953 she took part in the Fleet Review to celebrate the Coronation of Queen Elizabeth II. On 29 September 1953, Tyrian ran aground on Haisborough Sands, South-East of Cromer. She was refloated later that day.

In November 1956 Tyrian was placed in reserve at Chatham. Between 1957 and 1965 she was part of the Lisahally reserve. She was subsequently sold for scrap and arrived at Troon for breaking up on 9 March 1965.

References

Bibliography
 
 
 
 
 
 

 

S and T-class destroyers
Ships built on the River Tyne
1942 ships
World War II destroyers of the United Kingdom
Cold War destroyers of the United Kingdom
Type 16 frigates
Cold War frigates of the United Kingdom
Maritime incidents in 1953